William Laurence Bergsma (April 1, 1921 – March 18, 1994) was an American composer and teacher. He was long associated with Juilliard School, where he taught composition, until he moved to the University of Washington as head of their music school until 1971.

Life 
Bergsma was born in Oakland, California. After studying piano (with his mother, a former opera singer) and then the viola, he moved on to study composition. Bergsma attended Stanford University for two years (1938–40) before moving to the Eastman School of Music, where he earned his bachelor's and master's degrees; his most significant teachers there were Howard Hanson and Bernard Rogers.

In 1946 he accepted a position at Juilliard, where he remained until 1963, eventually holding such positions as chair of composition and from 1961 to 1963, associate dean. In 1963 he moved on to the University of Washington, heading the music school until 1971, remaining a professor from then on after stepping down from the administrative post. In 1966 Bergsma founded the Contemporary Group at the University of Washington, an organization of composers and musicians who stage performances of new musical works and educate students and the public about contemporary music; the group remains active to this day.

Bergsma was the recipient of two Guggenheim Fellowships, a grant from the National Endowment for the Arts, and an award from the American Academy of Arts and Letters. Students of Bergsma include composers Jack Behrens, Philip Glass, Karl Korte, Robert Parris, and Steve Reich.

Bergsma's music is noted for its lyrical, contrapuntal qualities. Unlike many of his contemporaries, Bergsma rejected serialism in favor of a more conservative style, though one distinctly rooted in the 20th century. He eschewed the avant-garde—his obituary in the Seattle Post-Intelligencer describes him as having "never deserted tonality" and seeing "dozens of his former avant-garde colleagues returning to the fold"—though he did embrace aleatoric techniques later in his career.

He composed two operas, The Wife of Martin Guerre (1956) and The Murder of Comrade Sharik (1973), which are markedly different in style. The first is a somber tale of a 16th-century French peasant's disappearance and return upon which he is suspected to be an impostor; the music is marked by dissonance which emphasizes the tension in the story, particularly in the final courtroom scene. The second is more lighthearted and comic; Bergsma wrote his own libretto after the story Heart of a Dog by Mikhail Bulgakov, which involves a dog transforming into a citizen of 1920s Moscow as a result of a doctor's experiments. The partially aleatoric orchestral writing is intended to be the voice of Stalin, and uses quotes from Carmen, La traviata and Don Giovanni for comedic effect. He was also a skillful composer of smaller works, including many for chamber ensemble and solo piano as well as orchestral writings.

Bergsma died in Seattle of a heart attack, at the age of 72.

Selected works 

Gold and the Señor Commandante (1940-41), ballet (also 9-movement suite)
The Fortunate Islands (1947), string orchestra
Tangents (1951), piano
A Carol on Twelfth Night (1954), orchestra
The Wife of Martin Guerre (1956), opera
A Desk for Billie (1956) (score for educational film)
March with Trumpets (1956), band
Concerto for wind quintet (1958)
Chameleon Variations (1960)  orchestra
Fantastic Variations on a Theme from Tristan and Isolde (1961), viola and piano
In Celebration, (1963), orchestra
Violin Concerto, (1965), violin and orchestra
The Sun, the Soaring Eagle, the Turquoise Prince, the God  (1968) Choir
The Murder of Comrade Sharik (1973), opera
Symphony no. 2, "Voyages" (1976), mezzo-soprano, chorus, and orchestra
Viola Concerto (1978)
The Voice of the Coelacanth (1981), horn, violin, and piano
Variations (1984), piano

References 
James P. Cassaro and Kurt Stone: "William Bergsma". Grove Music Online, ed. L. Macy. Accessed 24 May 2005. (subscription access).
James P. Cassaro: "William Bergsma". Grove Music Online (OperaBase), ed. L. Macy. Accessed 24 May 2005. (subscription access).
Worldlinkpages.com: William Bergsma, accessed 24 May 2005
William Bergsma: UW Composer of International Renown, accessed 24 May 2005.
"Obituary: William Bergsma". (March 21, 1994). Associated Press.

External links
The Contemporary Group
Program for a Memorial Concert in Honor of William Bergsma
Official site
Two Interviews with William Bergsma, August 9, 1986 and August 8, 1987
Overview page for William Bergsma papers, 1941-1986
"William Bergsma Collection", Sibley Music Library, Eastman School of Music

1921 births
1994 deaths
20th-century classical composers
20th-century American composers
20th-century American male musicians
American classical composers
American male classical composers
American opera composers
Male opera composers
Eastman School of Music alumni
Juilliard School faculty
Stanford University alumni
University of Washington faculty
Pupils of Howard Hanson
Pupils of Bernard Rogers